Jorgenson may refer to:
 Bill Jorgenson, American bluegrass musician
 Carl O. Jorgenson, American politician
 Dale W. Jorgenson, economist at Harvard University
 Dave Jorgenson, American journalist
 Joe Jorgenson, Australian rugby player
 John Jorgenson, American musician
 Warner Jorgenson, Canadian politician

Patronymic surnames